Parliamentary election were held in Venezuela on 8 November. Democratic Action won a plurality of seats, winning 61 of the 207 seats in the Chamber of Deputies and 21 of the 54 seats in the Senate. Voter turnout was 54.5% in the Senate elections and 52.7% in the Chamber elections.

People elected for the first time in this election include Nicolás Maduro and Juan Barreto (MVR), Henrique Capriles Radonski (COPEI) for the Chamber of Deputies; and Rafael Poleo (Democratic Action) and Julián Isaías Rodríguez Diaz (MVR) for the Senate.

Results

Senate

Chamber of Deputies

References

1998 in Venezuela
Venezuela
Elections in Venezuela
November 1998 events in South America
Election and referendum articles with incomplete results